is a town located in Yamagata Prefecture, Japan. , the town has an estimated population of 7,506 in 2678 households, and a population density of 20 persons per km².

Geography
Mamurogawa is located in the extreme northern Yamagata Prefecture, bordering on Akita Prefecture to the north. The town is located in the Shinjō Valley, surrounding by low mountains on all sides, with the Ōu Mountains to the northeast.  The area is known for its heavy snowfalls in winter.

Neighboring municipalities
Yamagata Prefecture
Sakata
Shinjō
Sakegawa
Kaneyama
Akita Prefecture
Yurihonjō
Yuzawa

Climate
Mamurogawa has a Humid continental climate (Köppen climate classification Cfa) with large seasonal temperature differences, with warm to hot (and often humid) summers and cold (sometimes severely cold) winters. Precipitation is significant throughout the year, but is heaviest from August to October.

Demographics
Per Japanese census data, the population of Mamurogawa peaked in the 1950s and has declined by more than half since then. It is now less than it was a century ago.

History
The area of present-day Mamurogawa was part of ancient Dewa Province and the location of Sakenobe Castle in the Sengoku period. After the start of the Meiji period, the area became part of Mogami District, Yamagata Prefecture. The village of Mamurogawa was established on April 1, 1889 with the establishment of the modern municipalities system. During World War II, an airbase for training pilots was established by the Imperial Japanese Army. The site is now a park, and part of the grounds of the local high school. Mamurogawa was elevated to town status on April 1, 1950. On August 1, 1954, it absorbed the neighboring villages of Araki and Nozoki.

Economy
The economy of Mamurogawa is based on agriculture and forestry.

Education
Mamurogawa has three public elementary schools and one public middle school operated by the town government and one public high school operated by the Yamagata Prefectural Board of Education.

Transportation

Railway
 East Japan Railway Company -   Ōu Main Line
  -  -  -

Highway
  – Mamurogawa interchange

Local attractions
 Kabusan Prefectural Park
 Tokasaka Dam

Notes

External links

Official Website 

Towns in Yamagata Prefecture
Mamurogawa, Yamagata